Stuart S. Nagel (August 29, 1934 – November 18, 2001) was an American academic. A Professor Emeritus of Political Science at the University of Illinois at Urbana–Champaign, he is notable for having coined the terms "super-optimizing" and "win-win analysis" and advancing the boundaries of policy studies.

Early life and education
Nagel grew up in West Rogers Park, a neighborhood of Chicago, Illinois. Nagel attended Senn High School and Central YMCA High School in Chicago.

He completed his undergraduate and graduate studies at Northwestern University, receiving a law degree in 1958 and a Ph.D. in political science in 1961.

Death and legacy
After Nagel's death at age 67, the Policy Studies Journal published, in 2003, a series of articles about Nagel's personal and academic life, entitled "Symposium in Honor of Stuart S. Nagel".

See also

 List of Northwestern University alumni
 List of people from Chicago
 List of University of Illinois at Urbana–Champaign people

References

 
 Rich, Paul J. (2005). "Policy Studies and Stuart Nagel". Policy Studies Organization.
 Staff (Spring 2002).  "In Memoriam".  Northwestern (quarterly alumni magazine of Northwestern University).  Retrieved August 25, 2012.

External links
 

Place of death missing
1934 births
2001 suicides
20th-century American educators
20th-century scholars

21st-century scholars
American political scientists
Northwestern University alumni
University of Illinois Urbana-Champaign faculty
Writers from Chicago
Northwestern University Pritzker School of Law alumni
20th-century political scientists